The Hunter of Fall  is an 1883 novel by the German writer Ludwig Ganghofer. It is set in Bavaria and depicts a running battle between a poacher and a gamekeeper.

Adaptations

The story has been adapted to film on a number of occasions.

References

Bibliography
 

1883 German novels
Novels by Ludwig Ganghofer
German novels adapted into films
Books about the Alps